Crocodile newt may refer to:

Anderson's crocodile newt (Echinotriton andersoni)
Tylototriton (genus):
Himalayan newt (Tylototriton verrucosus)
Red-tailed knobby newt (Tylototriton kweichowensis)
Vietnamese crocodile newt (Tylototriton vietnamensis)
Ziegler's crocodile newt (Tylototriton ziegleri)

Amphibian common names